Bubble Bobble Plus! and  are remakes of the 1986 arcade game Bubble Bobble. The games were developed and published by Taito. Bubble Bobble Plus! was released for WiiWare in Japan (as ) on February 10, 2009, in the PAL regions on April 10, 2009 and in North America on May 25, 2009 while Bubble Bobble Neo! was released on the Xbox Live Arcade download service for the Xbox 360 in Japan on August 5, 2009 and in North America on September 16, 2009.

Gameplay
As with previous games, the player will have to defeat all enemies across a number of screens by trapping them in bubbles and popping them. The normal mode features the original two playable characters, Bub and Bob, while the Arrange Mode adds support for up to 4 players, joined with female characters Peb and Pab, as yellow and pink bubble dragons respectively.

The game contains several playing modes - a remake containing 100 classic stages and a new story mode with 100 new stages, as well as more difficult "Super" versions of those stages.

In addition, for Bubble Bobble Plus!, two downloadable content packs (Extra 1 and Extra 2) were released consisting of 50 "very hard" stages each, as well as new boss characters. These Extra modes also include four player support.

Reception

Bubble Bobble Plus! received "generally favorable reviews", while Bubble Bobble Neo! received above-average reviews, according to the review aggregation website Metacritic. N-Europe praised the Wii version, saying it had a wealth of content to enjoy, while the downloadable packs were fairly reasonably priced and offered a significantly ramped up challenge from the standard levels.

References

External links
Famitsu scans

2009 video games
Bubble Bobble
Multiplayer and single-player video games
Nintendo Wi-Fi Connection games
Platform games
Taito games
Video games scored by Yasuhisa Watanabe
Wii games
Wii Wi-Fi games
WiiWare games
Xbox 360 games
Xbox 360 Live Arcade games
Video games developed in Japan